István Lichteneckert (17 August 1892 – 10 November 1929) was a Hungarian fencer. He won a bronze medal at the 1924 Summer Olympics in the team foil competition.

References

External links
 

1892 births
1929 deaths
Hungarian male foil fencers
Olympic fencers of Hungary
Fencers at the 1924 Summer Olympics
Olympic bronze medalists for Hungary
Olympic medalists in fencing
Martial artists from Budapest
Medalists at the 1924 Summer Olympics
20th-century Hungarian people